Mount O'Neil is a mountain, 2,090 m, just northeast of Mount Ratliff on the north side of Kansas Glacier. Mapped by United States Geological Survey (USGS) from ground surveys and U.S. Navy air photos, 1960–63. Named by Advisory Committee on Antarctic Names (US-ACAN) for Robert J. O'Neil, utilitiesman with the Byrd Station winter party in 1961.

Mountains of Marie Byrd Land